Brigadier W. P. B. Ashton, MC, CBE, (1897–1981) was a British Army officer and mechanical engineer who served in Malaya during the Second World War. Papers relating to his service are held by the Liddell Hart Centre for Military Archives, King's College London.

Early life
W.P.B. Ashton was born in 1897. He obtained a Bachelor of Science degree.

Career
Ashton served in the Royal Electrical and Mechanical Engineers of the British Army during the Second World War and was deputy director of ordnance services (engineering), Malaya Command, 1941–1942. His report on ordnance engineering services in Malaya, 1941–1942, written in 1946, is held in the Liddell Hart Centre for Military Archives, King's College London. He was awarded the Military Cross.

He was an associate member of the Institute of Mechanical Engineers. He was appointed Commander of the Order of the British Empire in the 1953 New Year's Honours List.

See also
Commonwealth Ordnance Services in Malaya and Singapore
List of British generals and brigadiers

References

External links
King's College London research guides.

1897 births
1981 deaths
British Army personnel of World War II
Recipients of the Military Cross
Commanders of the Order of the British Empire
Royal Electrical and Mechanical Engineers officers
British mechanical engineers
Collections of the Liddell Hart Centre for Military Archives